Ilyinsky (Ilyinskaya sopka) is a dormant stratovolcano located in the southern part of the Kamchatka Peninsula, Russia near Kurile Lake.

See also
 List of volcanoes in Russia

References 
 

Mountains of the Kamchatka Peninsula
Volcanoes of the Kamchatka Peninsula
Stratovolcanoes of Russia
Holocene stratovolcanoes
Holocene Asia